John Wallace may refer to:

Law and government 

John Wallace (Australian politician) (1828–1901), Australian politician
John Wallace (Canadian politician) (1812–1896), New Brunswick farmer and member of the Canadian House of Commons
John Wallace (English politician) (1840–1910), British Member of Parliament for Limehouse, 1892–1895
John Wallace (Florida politician) (1842–1908), Florida Republican politician
John Wallace (New Zealand judge) (1934–2012), chairman of the Royal Commission on the Electoral System, 1986
John Wallace (Scottish politician) (1868–1949), Member of Parliament for Dumfermline Burghs
John Alexander Wallace (1881–1961), Canadian politician
John Clifford Wallace (born 1928), United States federal judge
John D. Wallace (born 1949), Canadian politician who served as a Senator for New Brunswick
John E. Wallace Jr. (born 1942), former New Jersey Supreme Court justice
John M. Wallace (Indiana), a county judge and Indiana military officer during the American Civil War
John William Wallace (1815–1884), American lawyer
John Winfield Wallace (1818–1889), US congressman from Pennsylvania
John M. Wallace (1893–1989), American banker, philanthropist, and politician in Utah

Sports 
John Wallace (American football coach), college football coach, head football coach at Rutgers University (1924–1926)
John Wallace (American football end) (1904–1981), American football player
John Wallace (basketball) (born 1974), American basketball player
John Wallace (cricketer) (1924–2008), South African-born first-class cricketer, who played for Rhodesia
John Wallace (footballer) (born 1959), Australian footballer for Melbourne 
John Wallace (rower) (born 1962), Canadian rower
John Wallace (sailor) (1903–1990), American sailor

Arts 
John Wallace (musician) (fl. 1971–present), American bassist and singer
John Wallace, member of the bands Heavyshift and The Stargazers
John Bruce Wallace (born 1950), American musician and artist
John Graham Wallace (born 1966), English author of children's books
John Wallace (Haida), Haida people master carver

Other 
John Wallace (bishop) (1654–1733), Scottish Roman Catholic prelate
John Wallace (murderer) (1896–1950), Georgia landowner and crime lord whose murder of a sharecropper is documented in Murder in Coweta County
John Findley Wallace (1852–1921), American engineer best known as the Chief Engineer of the Panama Canal between 1904 and 1906
John Higgins Wallace Jr. (1906–1989), American chemist
John L. Wallace (born 1956), Canadian medical scientist
John M. Wallace Jr, American sociologist 
John Michael Wallace (born 1940), American atmospheric scientist
John-Paul Wallace (born 1976), English chess player
John Alexander Wallace (British Army officer) (1775–1857)
John Craig Wallace, horticulturalist and writer

See also 
Jackie Wallace (born 1951), American football player
Jack Wallace (disambiguation)
Jonathan Wallace (born 1986), basketball player
Jonathan H. Wallace (1824–1892), U.S. representative from Ohio
John Wallis (disambiguation)
John Wallace Scott (1832–1903), Medal of Honor recipient during the American Civil War
Wallace (surname)